Tellurium tetrafluoride, TeF4, is a stable, white, hygroscopic crystalline solid and is one of two fluorides of tellurium.  The other binary fluoride is tellurium hexafluoride. The widely reported Te2F10 has been shown to be F5TeOTeF5  There are other tellurium compounds that contain fluorine, but only the two mentioned contain solely tellurium and fluorine. Tellurium difluoride, TeF2, and ditellurium difluoride, Te2F2 are not known.

Preparation
Tellurium tetrafluoride can be prepared by the following reaction:

TeO2 + 2SF4 → TeF4 + 2SOF2

It is also prepared by reacting nitryl fluoride with tellurium or from the elements at 0 °C or by reacting selenium tetrafluoride with tellurium dioxide at 80 °C.
Fluorine in nitrogen can react with TeCl2 or TeBr2 to form TeF4.  PbF2 will also fluorinate tellurium to TeF4.

Reactivity
Tellurium tetrafluoride will react with water or silica and forms tellurium oxides.  Copper, silver, gold or nickel will react with tellurium tetrafluoride at 185 °C.  It does not react with platinum.  It is soluble in SbF5 and will precipitate out the complex TeF4SbF5.

Properties

Tellurium tetrafluoride melts at 130 °C and decomposes to tellurium hexafluoride at 194 °C.  In the solid phase, it consists of infinite chains of TeF3F2/2 in an octahedral geometry. A lone pair of electrons occupies the sixth position.

References
R.B. King; Inorganic Chemistry of Main Group Elements, VCH Publishers, New York, 1995.
W.C. Cooper; Tellurium, VanNostrand Reinhold Company, New York, 1971.

Tellurium(IV) compounds
Fluorides
Tellurium halides
Chalcohalides